Radyo 1 is a major radio network of TRT. This network is the earliest radio network in Turkey. Radyo-1 is not a specialized network and presents programs of general interest, including news, science, art, literature, drama, sports, environment, economy, magazine and music.

Technical details 

Originally the broadcast was on long wave and medium wave. But the infrastructure for MW transmission is now used by the regional radio services of TRT, and Radyo 1 is broadcast on FM band, except for the MW 927 kHz one which is still used for Radyo 1. Although there are many transmitter stations only those stations which are mainly directed to province capitals are shown below. The ERP power of these FM transmitters are 50 kW or more.

References

External links 

  

Turkish radio networks
Turkish Radio and Television Corporation